Sauce Department is a  department of Corrientes Province in Argentina.

External links 
 Sauce website 

Departments of Corrientes Province